Luis Eduardo López (born 23 June 1987) is an Argentine professional footballer who plays as a centre-forward for Atlanta.

Career
López's career got underway with Temperley during the 2008–09 Primera B Metropolitana campaign, a season he scored seven goals in; the first coming against Atlanta on 10 October 2008. In total, he scored twenty-one times in his first three seasons with Temperley. In August 2011, Primera B Nacional team Almirante Brown loaned López. Six appearances in all competitions followed. He returned to Temperley for the 2012–13 and 2013–14 seasons and subsequently netted twenty-eight goals, seventeen in 2013–14 which ended with promotion to the 2014 Primera B Nacional.

On 12 February 2015, following Temperley's promotion to the Argentine Primera División, López departed to Colombian football to play for Atlético Junior on loan. He scored his first goal for Junior on his debut appearance versus Barranquilla in the Copa Colombia on 29 March. A year later, López found himself out on loan once more - to Tristán Suárez in Primera B Metropolitana. Twelve goals followed in his first two campaigns, prior to Tristán Suárez signing him permanently ahead of the 2017–18 Primera B Metropolitana season. On 29 April 2019, it was announced that his contract had been terminated.

López completed a move to Atlanta on 20 June 2019. López left Atlanta in February 2021 to join Defensores de Belgrano, where he played for the rest of 2021. In January 2022, López moved to Deportivo Morón. However, he left the club again a few months later, after terminating his contract and on 31 May 2022, he signed a deal with his former club, Temperley.

Career statistics
.

Honours
Atlético Junior
Copa Colombia: 2015

References

External links

1987 births
Living people
Footballers from Buenos Aires
Argentine footballers
Association football forwards
Argentine expatriate footballers
Expatriate footballers in Colombia
Argentine expatriate sportspeople in Colombia
Primera B Metropolitana players
Primera Nacional players
Argentine Primera División players
Categoría Primera A players
Club Atlético Temperley footballers
Club Almirante Brown footballers
Atlético Junior footballers
CSyD Tristán Suárez footballers
Club Atlético Atlanta footballers
Defensores de Belgrano footballers
Deportivo Morón footballers